Commodores is the fifth studio album  by the Commodores, released in 1977. The album spent eight weeks at the top of the R&B/soul albums chart, the second of their albums to do so, and was their first Top 5 pop album. There is also a previously released extended version.

Reception

The band employed a variety of musical styles for the album, highlighted by the popular anthem "Brick House". With Walter Orange's deep voice on the lead, and Ronald LaPread's roundtone bassline, this track peaked on the U.S. Hot 100 at #5, and the U.S. R&B Chart at #4. "Brick House" means a "stacked" woman with an hour-glass figure.

In contrast to "Brick House", "Easy" is a pop ballad with mellow vocals by Lionel Richie.

"Zoom" is one of the Commodores' best known tunes, despite not being released as a single in the US. It reached #38 on the UK singles chart. Fergie sampled "Zoom" in her song "All That I Got (The Make-Up Song)" on the album The Dutchess.

In the UK and other Western European countries this album was released as Zoom on Tamla Motown.

The album was dedicated to Kathy Faye LaPread, bass guitarist Ronald LaPread's wife, who died from cancer around that time.

Track listing

Personnel 
Commodores
 Lionel Richie – vocals, saxophones, keyboards
 Milan Williams – keyboards 
 Thomas McClary – vocals, guitars
 Ronald LaPread – vocals, bass
 Walter Orange – vocals, drums, percussion
 William King – vocals, trumpet 

Additional musicians
 Cal Harris – synthesizers 
 Darrell Jones – guitars

Production 
 Commodores – producers, arrangements 
 James Anthony Carmichael – producer, arrangements
 Cal Harris – engineer, mixing 
 Jane Clark – engineer 
 Jack Andrews – mastering 
 Carl Overr – graphics director 
 Stan Martin – design 
 Tom Nikosey – illustration 
 Gene Gurley – photography 
 Benjamin Ashburn – album coordinator, manager

Charts

Singles

See also
List of number-one R&B albums of 1977 (U.S.)

References

Commodores albums
1977 albums
Albums produced by James Anthony Carmichael
Albums produced by Lionel Richie
Motown albums